Duan, Doan, or Halang Doan, is a language spoken by more than four thousand people on either side of the Laotian–Vietnamese border.  There are some 2,346 speakers in Attopu Province, Laos, and another couple of thousand in Kon Tum Province, Vietnam. It is too poorly known to classify completely and may be mutually intelligible with Takua, Kayong, Halang, and Rengao. Might be a part of the Xơ Ɖăng ethnic group.

References

Further reading
Mole, Robert L. (1968) Peoples of Tribes of South Vietnam. vol. 1. Chapter 9.
Schrock, Joann, William Stockton Jr., Elaine Murphy, and Marilou Fromme. (1966) Minority Groups in the Republic of Vietnam. Chapter 4.
Schliesinger, Joachim. 1998. Hill Tribes of Vietnam. vol 2 Profile of the Existing Hill Tribe Groups. (Schliesinger lumps Doan in with the Gie-Trieng ethnic group p.28).

Languages of Laos
Bahnaric languages
Languages of Vietnam